Boies Penrose (November 1, 1860 – December 31, 1921) was an American lawyer and Republican politician from Philadelphia, Pennsylvania.

After serving in both houses of the Pennsylvania legislature, he represented Pennsylvania in the United States Senate from 1897 until his death in 1921. Penrose was the fourth political boss of the Pennsylvania Republican political machine (known under his bossism as the Penrose machine), following Simon Cameron, Donald Cameron, and Matthew Quay. Penrose was the longest-serving Pennsylvania U.S. senator until Arlen Specter surpassed his record in 2005.

Early life
Born into a prominent Old Philadelphian family of Cornish descent, he was a grandson of Speaker of the Pennsylvania Senate Charles B. Penrose and brother of gynecologist Charles Bingham Penrose and mining entrepreneurs Richard and Spencer Penrose. He was a descendant of the prominent Biddle family of Philadelphia.

Penrose attended Harvard University, where he became a member of Beta Theta Pi. He graduated second in his class in 1881. After reading the law with an established firm, he was admitted to the Pennsylvania Bar in 1883.

State politics
Although Penrose wrote two books on political reform, he joined the political machine of Matthew Quay, a Pennsylvania Republican political boss. He was elected to the Pennsylvania House of Representatives in 1884, and was elected to the Pennsylvania Senate for the 6th district in 1886. He served as president pro tempore from 1889 to 1891.

Penrose served as a member of the Pennsylvania House of Representatives from 1884 to 1886 and as a member of the Pennsylvania Senate for the 6th district from 1887 to 1897. He was President Pro Tempore from 1889 to 1891.

Penrose was elected Chairman of the State Republican Party in 1903, succeeding fellow Senator Matthew Quay. A year later, Quay died, and Penrose was appointed to succeed him as the state's Republican National Committeeman. He quickly became a power broker in the state, enabling figures like Richard Baldwin to advance through loyalty to his organization.

In 1912, Penrose was forced out of power by the progressive faction of the party led by William Flinn, in 1912. Penrose did not stand for re-election to his national committee post. However, following Flinn's departure from the party to support Theodore Roosevelt's Progressive Party, Penrose was able to garner enough support to return to his post as national committeeman and would remain in the position until his death.

U.S. Senator 
In 1897, the state legislature elected Penrose to the United States Senate over John Wanamaker. He left his office as a State Senator that year to take the new position.

Penrose was a dominant member of the Senate Finance Committee and supported high protective tariffs. He had also served on the United States Senate Committee on Banking, United States Senate Committee on Naval Affairs, United States Senate Committee on Post Office and Post Roads, United States Senate Committee on Education and Labor, and United States Senate Committee on Immigration. One of Penrose's most important legislative actions was adding the "oil depletion allowance" to the Revenue Act of 1913. Penrose consistently supported "pro-business" policies, and opposed labor reform and women's rights.

In the 1912 presidential election, Penrose strongly supported incumbent President William Howard Taft over former President Theodore Roosevelt. After a campaign that consisted of heavy attacks on Penrose, Roosevelt won the state in the 1912 election, although Democrat Woodrow Wilson won the national vote. Penrose was also a major supporter of Warren Harding, and helped the Ohio Senator win the 1920 Republican nomination. Penrose's role in Harding's election helped earn Pennsylvanian Andrew W. Mellon the role of Secretary of the Treasury.

In 1914, Penrose faced his first direct election (following the passage of the Seventeenth Amendment). He publicly campaigned for the first time in his life and defeated Democrat A. Mitchell Palmer and Progressive Gifford Pinchot.

In November 1915, Penrose accompanied the Liberty Bell on its nationwide tour returning to Pennsylvania from the Panama-Pacific International Exposition in San Francisco; Penrose accompanied the bell to New Orleans and then to Philadelphia. The Liberty Bell has not been moved from Pennsylvania since.

Personal life and business 
Penrose was an avid outdoorsman and took pleasure in mountain exploration and big-game hunting. Penrose climbed and named at least two mountains: one in Montana and another in the Dickson Range in the Bridge River Country of British Columbia.

The Senator was a large, heavy man and, according to his hunting guide, W.G. (Bill) Manson, they had to spend a lot of time to find a horse hop big enough to carry Penrose and his custom saddle. The horse was called "Senator." After Penrose stopped riding, the horse was retired to pasture because no standard saddle would fit him.

In 1903 Boies, along with his brothers and father, invested in the formation of the Utah Copper Company.

Death and legacy

Penrose died in his Wardman Park penthouse suite in Washington, D.C. in the last hour of 1921, after suffering a pulmonary thrombosis. He was buried in the family grave section in the Laurel Hill Cemetery in Philadelphia.

Following Penrose's death, his lieutenant Joseph Grundy became one of the leaders of the Republican machine, but no one boss dominated the party like Penrose and his predecessors had.

A statue of Penrose modeled by Philadelphia sculptor Samuel Murray has been in Harrisburg, Pennsylvania's Capitol Park since September 1930.

See also
List of United States Congress members who died in office (1900–49)

References

External links

 

 

1860 births
1921 deaths
19th-century American politicians
20th-century American politicians
American people of Cornish descent
American political bosses from Pennsylvania
Burials at Laurel Hill Cemetery (Philadelphia)
Chairs of the Republican State Committee of Pennsylvania
Deaths from pulmonary embolism
Episcopal Academy alumni
Harvard University alumni
Republican Party members of the Pennsylvania House of Representatives
Republican Party Pennsylvania state senators
Politicians from Philadelphia
Presidents pro tempore of the Pennsylvania Senate
Republican Party United States senators from Pennsylvania
Conservatism in the United States